Eupithecia ridiculata is a moth in the family Geometridae. It is found in Iran.

References

Moths described in 1938
ridiculata
Moths of the Middle East